is a Japanese singer from Shinjuku, Tokyo, Japan.

Theme songs 
 Kaze no No Reply (風のノー・リプライ), second opening theme song from TV series Heavy Metal L-Gaim (1984)
 Zeta – Toki wo Koete (Z・刻をこえて), first opening theme song from TV series Mobile Suit Zeta Gundam (1985)
 Hoshizora no Believe (星空のBelieve), ending theme song from TV series Mobile Suit Zeta Gundam (1985)
 Yume Iro Chaser (夢色チェイサー), first opening theme song from TV series Metal Armor Dragonar (1987)
 Illusion wo Sagashite (イリュージョンをさがして), first ending theme song from TV series Metal Armor Dragonar (1987)

Discography

Singles 
 – Collaboration with Hiroko Moriguchi (October 23, 2019)

Albums 

 走Do愛 
 
 

 Fifty Fifty 
 

 Candy Game = キャンディ・ゲーム 
 

 Face 鮎川麻弥 Ⅳ 
 

 Chase 鮎川麻弥 Ⅴ 
 

 Mami Selection. Melting Point. 
 

 新視界 
 

 Smile  
 

 Restless Hearts 
 

 101番目の恋 = Hundred And First Love

References

External links 
  
  
  
 

1961 births
Living people
Japanese women singers
Anime musicians
Singers from Tokyo